Kristang may mean:

 Kristang people (cristãos), an ethnic group of Eurasian ancestry in Malaysia and Singapore
 Kristang language (cristão, papiá kristang), the creole originally spoken by that community

See also
Kirishitan, in Japan

Language and nationality disambiguation pages